The National Natural Landmarks (NNLs) in Wisconsin include 18 of the almost 600 such landmarks in the United States. They cover areas of geological, biological and historical importance, and include dune and swales, swamps, bogs, and virgin forests. Several of the sites provide habitat for rare or endangered plant and animal species. The Driftless Area in southwest Wisconsin is known for its rare species, especially in the Baraboo Range. Owners include private individuals, Native American tribes, and several county, state and federal agencies. These landmarks were designed between 1967 and 1987.

The National Natural Landmarks Program is administered by the National Park Service, a branch of the Department of the Interior. The National Park Service determines which properties meet NNL criteria and, after notifying the owners, makes nomination recommendations. The Secretary of the Interior reviews nominations and, based on a set of predetermined criteria, makes a decision on NNL designation or a determination of eligibility for designation. Both public and privately owned properties can be designated as NNLs. Owners may object to the nomination of the property as a NNL. This designation provides indirect, partial protection of the historic integrity of the properties via tax incentives, grants, monitoring of threats, and other means.

National Natural Landmarks

References

Wisconsin
Wisconsin geography-related lists